GBR-13119 is a psychostimulant and dopamine re-uptake inhibitor.

References

Stimulants